Little Johnny Jones (born Johnnie Jones; November 1, 1924November 19, 1964) was an American Chicago blues pianist and singer, best known for his work with Tampa Red, Muddy Waters, and Elmore James.

Life and career
Jones was born in Jackson, Mississippi, United States, in 1924, and was a cousin of Otis Spann. He arrived in Chicago in 1945 in the company of Little Walter and "Baby Face" Leroy Foster and soon replaced pianist Big Maceo Merriweather in Tampa Red's band after Merriweather suffered a stroke paralysing his right hand. Like several other Chicago pianists of his era, his style was heavily influenced by Merriweather, from whom he had learned and for whom he played piano after Merriweather's stroke.

Jones later backed Muddy Waters on harmonica and recorded a session (on piano and vocals) with him for Aristocrat Records in 1949. He also played on ten sessions with Tampa Red for the Victor label between 1949 and 1953. From 1952 to 1956, he played and recorded with Elmore James, and also played on sessions by Albert King, Jimmy Rogers and others, as well as occasionally recording under his own name. In later years, he worked with Howlin' Wolf, Billy Boy Arnold, Junior Wells, and Magic Sam, among others.

Jones was a heavy drinker and had a reputation as a wild character. According to Homesick James, who worked and toured with them in the 1950s, "Elmore and Johnnie used to just have a fight every night". His 1949 Aristocrat side "Big Town Playboy" is regarded as a classic of the genre, and was covered by the guitarist Eddie Taylor in 1955.

Jones married his wife, Letha, in 1952. He died of bronchopneumonia in Cook County Hospital, and was interred at Restvale Cemetery in November 1964.

On May 14, 2011, the fourth annual White Lake Blues Festival took place at the Howmet Playhouse Theater, in Whitehall, Michigan. The event was organized by executive producer Steve Salter, of the nonprofit organization Killer Blues, to raise monies to honor Jones's unmarked grave with a headstone. The concert was a success, and a headstone was placed in June 2011.

Discography

Singles
"Big Town Playboy"/"Shelby County Blues", Aristocrat 405
"Sweet Little Woman"/"I May Be Wrong", Flair 1010
"Hoy, Hoy"/"Doin' the Best I Can (Up the Line)", Atlantic 1045

Albums
Live in Chicago with Billy Boy Arnold, Alligator AL-4717 (1979, recorded 1963)

With Howlin' Wolf
The Real Folk Blues (Chess, 1956-64 [1965])

References

Bibliography
Rowe, M. (1981). Chicago Blues: The City and the Music.  New York, Da Capo Press.

External links
 Illustrated Little Johnny Jones discography

1924 births
1964 deaths
Chicago blues musicians
American blues pianists
American male pianists
American blues singers
American blues harmonica players
Musicians from Jackson, Mississippi
Blues musicians from Mississippi
Deaths from pneumonia in Illinois
20th-century American singers
20th-century American pianists
Deaths from bronchopneumonia
20th-century American male singers
Burials at Restvale Cemetery